Hank Parker Jr. (born October 7, 1975) is a former American stock car racing driver.  He is a retired competitor in NASCAR Busch Series and Craftsman Truck Series competition, posting two wins and a best points finish of 14th in the Busch Series. His brother, Billy Parker, ran part-time in the Busch Series in 2004, and his father, Hank, is a professional outdoorsman.

Career
Parker began racing go-karts near his home in Denver, North Carolina. From there, he moved onto street stock racing at Concord Motorsports Park, where he won seven feature racing events in his first eighteen starts. The next season, he began running Late Model races and finished fifth in points. He won two races the next year.

In 1997, Parker moved to the Slim Jim All Pro Series, a former NASCAR touring series located in the Southeast United States. Parker picked up one win and was named the series' Most Popular Driver. He also made his NASCAR debut at the Jiffy Lube Miami 300 at Homestead in the No. 78 Mark III Financial Chevrolet, starting 41st and finishing 23rd.

Parker returned to the 78 in 1998, hoping to run the full schedule. After he was unable to qualify for most of his attempts, he was released. He did not run again until the AC Delco 200, where he finished sixth in the No. 53 B.A.S.S Chevrolet owned by his father.

Parker ran his father's car full-time in 1999, posting two top-fives and finishing 18th in points. He also finished second to Tony Raines for Rookie of the Year honors despite missing five races. In 2000, Parker received sponsorship from Team Marines and won his first career pole position at Las Vegas Motor Speedway. He also had eight top-tens and finished a career-best fourteenth in points.

In 2001, Parker switched to the No. 36 GNC Live Well Chevy for Cicci-Welliver Racing. He finished 15th in points, and collected his first win at the Auto Club 300. At the end of the season, his team was sold to Wayne Jesel and switched to Dodge for the 2002 season. He won another race at Pikes Peak International Raceway and had eight top-tens. He also made his Winston Cup debut, driving the No. 91 USG Dodge for Evernham Motorsports at North Carolina Speedway. He started 25th and finished 33rd, four laps down.

At the end of the 2002 season, Parker was to take GNC over to ppc Racing but due to a new law that restricts advertising with supplements, this caused GNC to leave NASCAR and therefore, leaving him without a full-time ride into 2003. He began the season running a pair of races for Brewco Motorsports, finishing sixth at Darlington Raceway. He ran four more races that season splitting time between NEMCO Motorsports and Chance 2 Motorsports, finishing fifth twice. He also made his Craftsman Truck Series debut driving the No. 75 for Spears Motorsports, posting two top-ten finishes.

In 2004, Parker signed to drive for Innovative Motorsports' new Craftsman Truck team. He had four top-tens and finished seventeenth in points. Unfortunately, Innovative closed its doors at the end of the season, leaving Parker unemployed again. He made his last start in 2005 filling for Carl Edwards at Nashville. He won the pole, but finished 20th.

Parker then decided to retire from racing; he joined his father and brother to produce Hank Parker 3D, an outdoors-themed television show.

Motorsports career results

NASCAR
(key) (Bold – Pole position awarded by qualifying time. Italics – Pole position earned by points standings or practice time. * – Most laps led.)

Winston Cup Series

Busch Series

Craftsman Truck Series

* Season still in progress
1 Ineligible for series points

Winston West Series

References

External links 
 
 Hank Parker Jr. at NASCAR.com (archived)
  of Hank Parker 3D, Parker's current TV show

Living people
1975 births
American Christians
People from Denver, North Carolina
Racing drivers from North Carolina
NASCAR drivers
American fishers
American television personalities
Male television personalities
Evernham Motorsports drivers
RFK Racing drivers